The following is a list some of the exports of Russia. Data is for 2019, in millions of United States dollars, as reported by the International Trade Centre.

Exports

See also 
 Russian economy

References

 International Trade Centre - International Trade Statistics (2019) - Monthly, quarterly and yearly trade data. Import & export values, volumes, growth rates, market shares, etc.

Exports
Russia
Foreign trade of Russia